Triadic Memories is a solo piano piece composed by the American composer Morton Feldman in 1981, jointly dedicated to the classical pianists Roger Woodward and Aki Takahashi. This piece heralds the composer's late period and lasts around 90 minutes.The score of Triadic Memories is published by Universal Edition (London) Ltd UE 17326. Woodward performed the world premiere at the ICA London, UK, October 5th, 1981 in the presence of the composer and the French premiere at the 1997 Festival d’automne à Paris au Théâtre Molière.

References 

1981 compositions
Compositions by Morton Feldman